The Sarvajanik College of Engineering and Technology (SCET) is an engineering college that is a part of the Sarvajanik Education Society. Sarvajanik Education Society's proposal for state university is accepted by Gujarat assembly on 30 March 2021.

The college was started in 1995 in Surat, Gujarat, at the RK Desai Marg in the Athwalines area opposite to Jawaharlal Nehru Udhyan (Chaupaty). The college is located in Sarvajanik Education Society Campus and Near P.T. Science college, M.T.B. arts college and K.P.Commerce college.

Courses
When SCET opened in 1995, it had departments of Electronics Engineering, Chemical Engineering, Architecture, Textile Technology and Processing. It was the first college to offer engineering degrees in Textiles, which is the major industry of Surat.

In 1997, the college expanded and now has departments of Computer Engineering, Electrical Engineering, Instrumentation & Control and Information Technology. An Environmental Science department has started.

Undergraduate
Courses of study include Bachelor of Engineering (B.E)
 Chemical Engineering
 Civil Engineering
 Computer Engineering
 Electrical Engineering - NBA Accredited since 2017
 Electronics and Communication Engineering - NBA Accredited since 2017
 Information Technology 
 Instrumentation and control engineering - NBA Accredited since 2017
 Textile Technology - NBA Accredited since 2017
 Mechanical Engineering
 Bachelor of Architecture (B.Arch.)

Postgraduate

 Master of Engineering in Civil Engineering (Town & Country Planning)
 Master of Engineering in Civil Engineering (Structure)
 Master of Engineering in Computer Engineering
 Master of Engineering in Electronics and Communication Engineering (2011 to 2020)
 Master of Engineering in Electrical Engineering (2011 to 2020)
 Master of Engineering in Environmental Engineering
 Master of Computer Application (M.C.A.)
 Master of Architecture (M.Arch.) in City Design

Affiliations and recognitions
SCET is affiliated to Gujarat Technological University (GTU), earlier it was affiliated to  Veer Narmad South Gujarat University. It is approved by All India Council for Technical Education (AICTE) for all engineering courses and by Council of Architecture for B Arch and M Arch.

It was selected by the Department of Science and Technology (India) to set up an environmental based project, Technology Information Forecasting and Assessment Council, Centre of Relevance & Excellence (TIFAC-CORE) under the mission REACH of the president of India Dr. A.P.J. Abdul Kalam for his vision India Vision 2020. SCET has been identified as Resource Institute by the National Programme on Earthquake Engineering Education (NPEEE) launched by Ministry of Human Resource Development (India) to train teachers of architecture for introducing Earthquake Engineering in West and Central Zone with IIT Kanpur.

See also
List of tourist attractions in Surat  
Sir P. T. Sarvajanik College of Science

References

External links
 [1] http://gtu.ac.in/affiliation/2016/Affiliation/BE%20-%20COLLEGES.pdf
 [2] SCET Official website
 [3] Website of SCET's Technology Festival, Kshitij
 [4] GTU wikipage
 [5] Gujarat Technological university

All India Council for Technical Education
Engineering colleges in Gujarat
Education in Surat
Educational institutions established in 1995
1995 establishments in Gujarat